CMO may refer to:

Business
 Chief marketing officer
 Chief medical officer, the senior government official designated head of medical services
 Chief merchandising officer
 Collateralized mortgage obligation, a type of complex debt security
 Contract manufacturing organization, a pharmaceutical manufacturing outsourcing organization
 Collective management organization, an organisation that manages intellectual property rights, like copyrights, on behalf of rightsholders.

Organizations
 Chicago, St. Paul, Minneapolis and Omaha Railway
 Chi Mei Optoelectronics, producer of TFT LCD panels
 Citizens' Municipal Organisation, Australian political organisation
 Commodore's Messenger Organization, a high-ranking group with the Scientology Sea Organisation
 Congressional caucus or congressional member organization

Science and engineering
 Central massive object at the center of a galaxy, either a supermassive black hole, or a nuclear star cluster
 Cetyl myristoleate, a type of fatty acid ester
 Corticosterone 18-monooxygenase, an enzyme involved in steroid hormone metabolism
 Cubic mile of oil, a global-scale measure of energy, roughly equal to the amount of oil consumed worldwide each year
 Comfort measures only, a medical abbreviation for an end-of-life care instruction

Other uses
 Canadian Mathematical Olympiad
 Cyprus Mathematical Olympiad, organised by the Cyprus Mathematical Society
 CAMPUS Magazine Online
 Check Mii Out, channel for the Wii
 Civil-military operations, activities of a military force
 Command: Modern Operations, commercial wargaming software

See also
 CMOS (disambiguation)